John Anthony Roche (18 May 1932 – 1988) was an English footballer who played as a forward. Born in Poplar, London, he played professionally for Millwall and Crystal Palace between 1957 and 1960, making a total of 61 Football League appearances.

Career
Roche began his career in non-league football with Margate before signing for Millwall in 1957. In May 1959, he signed for Crystal Palace then playing in the Football League Fourth Division. He made a goal-scoring debut on 3 September in a home 3–2 win against Oldham Athletic and went on to make 36 appearances that season, scoring 11 times. At the end of the 1959–60 season, he returned to Margate.

Personal life
Roche died in 1988, aged 53 or 54. His grandson Jamie Roche is also a footballer, in Sweden's top tier – born in Sweden to a Swedish mother and Roche's son (who himself played semi-professionally).

References

External links

Johnny Roche at holmesdale.net

1932 births
1988 deaths
English footballers
Footballers from Poplar, London
Margate F.C. players
Millwall F.C. players
Crystal Palace F.C. players
Association football forwards
English Football League players